Australia vs England in rugby league is a rivalry between the Australia national rugby league team and the England national rugby league team in the sport of rugby league. The first test match between the two sides was in 1975, with a 10–10 draw being the result.

Before 1975, Australia used to play England in Kangaroo tour games. These matches were not counted as official test matches and are noted as so in the list of matches below. Also, the 1975 World Cup challenge match is not counted as a test, and is only counted in the overall tally.

Head to Head

Results

1900s

1910s

1920s

1930s

1970s

1990s

2000s

2010s

See also 
 The Ashes (rugby league)
 Australia–England sports rivalries
 History of rugby union matches between Australia and England

References

Further reading 

 

Rugby league rivalries
Australia national rugby league team
England national rugby league team
Sports rivalries in Australia